Kristine Yuki Aono (born 1960) is an American artist from the Midwest of the United States.
Her sister is artist Joanne Aono.

Biography 
Aono grew up in the northern neighborhood of Chicago in Edgewater, which at the time had a primarily Japanese-American demographic, at her great grandparents home. She later moved to Orland Park where the demographic was mostly European American. Aono grew up in a three story flat complex filled with her relatives. Art had always been in her life, as Aono grew up in a household that used art as a medium to express themselves. She is a third generation Japanese-American referred to as Sansei.

Influences 
In 1983 Aono was beginning to take an interest in art when she discovered her Japanese ancestry. This discovery would also reveal her family’s history and cause her to reflect on her ethnic identity. The materials that she uses in her art consists of everyday items which she uses to communicate the issues of lost heritage and identity that is faced by Japanese Americans.

Aono bases her work off a concept, then chooses materials that are relative to creating an experience.

School

College of Art at Washington University in St. Louis, Skowhegan School of Painting and Sculpture in Maine, residencies at the MacDowell Colony and Virginia Center for the Arts.

Art

She has several sculptures in her early work but is primarily known for installations. Her two earliest sculptures are "Cultural Inheritance" and "Rope Kimono", which were both released in the 1990s.

Aono approaches these objects and forms in a disciplinary manner to search and represent ethnic identity utilizing sociology, anthropology, history, and architecture.

In the 1990s, Aono’s works would use a different form of art called multimedia installations, where she takes ordinary objects and modernizes them in relation to Japanese American history. The history that she chooses to focus on is not only a part of her family’s history, but all Japanese Americans who experienced being placed in internment camps during World War II. Aono has commented on this, stating that “There’s a story behind each [object] and a person behind each story… The whole internment experience was about individual people… it wasn’t just this mass exodus.”

Exhibitions 
Sculptures

Cultural Inheritance

Wire mesh, thread, charcoal, gold leaf flakes, Japanese maple leaves, wood, plaster.

111 x 48 x 20"

Josei

Wire mesh, thread.

17 x 24 x 5"

Twigs

Wire mesh, twigs, thread

17 x 26 x 6"

Cherry Tree Leaf Josei

Wiremesh, cherry leaves, thread

17 x 24 6"

Blue Dansei

Wire mesh, thread, sewing needles, paint

16 x 48 x 6"

Rope Kimono II

DesignCast plaster, wire mesh, fabric, rope, Japanese and North American maple leaves, wood, pigment.

59 x 48 x 24"

Obasan/Grandma Kimono

Hydrocal plaster, wire mesh, fabric, photocopies, rice, barbed wire

52 x 26 x 15"

Ghost Kimono

Hydrocal plaster, wire mesh, fabric, gesso, ash

59 x 33 x 20"

Kimono

Hydrocal plaster, wire mesh, fabric, rope, leaves, pigment.

53 x 28 x 12'

Leaf Kimono

Wire mesh, branch with leaves, embroidery thread.

66 x 91 x 10"

Sewn Kimono

Wire mesh, sewing needles, metallic thread, aluminum rod.

66 x 72 x 4"

Sakura Kimono

Wire mesh, embroidery thread, branch, cherry tree leaves

66 x 75 x 10"

Flag Kimono

Wire mesh, thread, paint, aluminum rod

93 x 72 x 6"

Formstone Roehouse Fish

Fiberglass fish, Formstone bricks, clay, paint, metal chair, plastic flowers.

36 x 72 x 18"

Installations

Relics from Camp

And the Bride Wore….

Deru Kugi Wa Utareru: The Nail That Sticks Up The Farthest Takes The Most Pounding

Issei, Nisei, Sansei…

References 

Aono, Kristine. “Kristine Aono”. Web. 
Machida, Margo. Unsettled visions: contemporary Asian American artists and the social imaginary. Durham: Duke U Press, 2008. Print.
Kim, Elaine H., Margo Machida, and Sharon Mizota. Fresh talk, daring gazes: conversations on Asian American art. Berkeley: U of California Press, 2003. Print.
O'Brien, Dennis. "Interned Recall Life in Camps." Chicago Tribune, January 19, 1997.
Knight, Christopher. “Relocations in long beach a generous, provocative show.” Los Angeles Times, May 21, 1992.
Vela, Maureen, "Kristine Aono Interview" (2017). Asian American Art Oral History Project.  90.      http://via.library.depaul.edu/oral_his_series/90

1960 births
Living people
American women artists
21st-century American women
Sam Fox School of Design & Visual Arts alumni
Washington University in St. Louis alumni
Skowhegan School of Painting and Sculpture alumni
American people of Japanese descent
American artists of Japanese descent
Artists from Chicago